Ernest William Jones (December 1870 – 17 September 1941) was a Welsh trans-European steamship agent, and a first class cricketer.

Family 

Ernest, who was born in Glamorgan during December 1870 and was educated at Wycliffe College, Gloucestershire, was the son of William Matthew Jones (b. 1838), who was an owner of the trans-European steamship agency M. Jones and Brothers (est. 1856), by Agnes Ida Long (1845 – 1899). Ernest's only sibling was the gynaecologist Arthur Webb-Jones (1875 – 1917). Ernest's cousins were Edwin Price Jones, who was Vice-Consul for Chile and Secretary to the Chamber of Commerce, and William (Bill) Wynn Jones, who was Anglican Bishop of Central Tanganyika.

Cricket 
Ernest, who inherited ownership of M. Jones and Brothers (est. 1856), had a 45-year cricketing career playing for Swansea from 1887 to 1904; and for Glamorgan County Cricket Club from 1890 to 1911 (between which he played in every single match and was a member of the side that won the Minor Counties Championship in 1900); and (in first class cricket) for South Wales from 1905 and 1909; and for the Gentleman of Glamorgan from 1913.

Marriage Death and Bankruptcy
In 1901, at Rouen, Haute Normandie, France, Ernest married Aimée Elizabeth Parson
(1873 - 1913), who was the French-born daughter of James Holmes Parson, who was a merchant banker in Italy. Ernest's only son was the choral conductor James William Webb-Jones (b. 1904), whose daughter Bridget married the chorister Peter Stanley Lyons in 1957. Ernest, and his son James William, and his cousin William (Bill) Wynn Jones, were all members of the Jesters Cricket Club, including in its 1931 side.

Ernest died on 17 September 1941, and his trans-European steamship agency, M. Jones and Brothers (est. 1856), was dissolved in 1942. His cousin William (Bill) Wynn Jones, who was Anglican Bishop of Central Tanganyika, died by car accident in 1951.

References

1870 births
1941 deaths
Welsh industrialists
British businesspeople in shipping
Welsh cricketers
People educated at Wycliffe College, Gloucestershire